Virgil Peck Jr. (born August 21, 1959) is a Republican and former member of the Kansas House of Representatives, representing the 12th district (in southeast Kansas, Montgomery County). He is currently representing Kansas State Senate district 15. He is the former chairman of the Kansas House Transportation and Public Safety Budget Committees, and the former Republican Majority Caucus Chairman.

Prior to his election, he ran unsuccessfully for House district 11 in 2002, and for Kansas Senate district 15 in 2000.

Issue positions
Peck identifies as "Pro-Low Taxes, Pro-Life, Pro-Education, Pro-Business, Pro-Agriculture," and "Pro-2nd Amendment." He states, "We need to address property tax relief, immigration reform, health care costs, state debt, and bring state government spending under control."

Controversies

Illegal immigrants remark
On Monday, March 14, 2011, during a committee discussion about a state plan to use gunmen in helicopters to control the feral swine population, Peck said, "If shooting these immigrating feral hogs works, maybe we have found a (solution) to our illegal immigration problem." Peck issued an apology by stating, "My statements yesterday were regrettable. Please accept my apology."

Proposed $10,000 legislators' raise
In the 2013 legislative session, Peck introduced a bill to raise lawmakers pay by $10,000. The bill failed to receive substantial support.

Committee membership
Representative Peck serves on the following legislative committees:

 Joint Committee on Legislative Post Audit (Chair)
 Education Budget
 Elections
 Local Government
 Pensions & Benefits

References

External links
 Official website
 Kansas Legislature – Virgil Peck Jr.
 Project Vote Smart profile
 Kansas Votes profile
 State Surge - Legislative Profile
 Follow the Money campaign contributions:
 2000,2002, 2004, 2006, 2008

Republican Party members of the Kansas House of Representatives
Living people
1959 births
21st-century American politicians
Republican Party Kansas state senators